Alli is a surname and a unisex given name. Notable people with the name include:

Surname 
 Antero Alli (born 1952), astrologer
 Darogha Ubbas Alli (19th century), Indian engineer and photographer
 Dele Alli (born 1996), professional footballer
 Waheed Alli, Baron Alli (born 1964), British media entrepreneur and politician and notable gay Muslim
 Yusuf Alli (born 1960), retired Nigerian long jumper

Given name

Male
 Alli Abrew (born 1974), American football player
 Alli Austria (born 1990), Filipino basketball player
 Alli Muhammad (born 1968), African-American doctor
 Alli N'Dri (born 1984), Ivorian footballer

Female
 Alli Lahtinen (1926–1976), Finnish politician
 Alli Mauzey, American actress
 Alli Nissinen (1866–1926), Finnish educator
 Alli Owens (born 1988), American racing driver
 Alli Paasikivi (1879–1960), First Lady of Finland (1946–1956)
 Alli Webb, American author

Fictional characters 

 Alli Bhandari, in the Canadian television drama Degrassi: The Next Generation, played by Melinda Shankar

See also 
 Ali (disambiguation)
 "Alli", a brand name for the medication Orlistat
 Alli (film), a 1964 Indian Tamil-language film
 Alli, Iran, a village
 Allie (disambiguation)
 Ally (disambiguation)
 Alliance of Independent Authors (ALLi)